New Hampshire Route 45 is a  north–south state highway in southern New Hampshire. It runs from Greenville to Temple.

Route description
NH 45 begins at NH 123 in Greenville. It runs northwest into the town of New Ipswich for a short distance, then into the town of Temple where it ends at NH 101.

In Temple, the highway is named Senator Tobey Highway. In Greenville, the road starts as Main Street at the center of town. At the north end of town, the road becomes Temple Road then becomes Greenville-Temple Highway farther north. There are various views along the road to the nearby Wapack Range.

Junction list

References

External links

 New Hampshire State Route 45 on Flickr

045
Transportation in Hillsborough County, New Hampshire